Joaquín Hernández Gallego (born 5 February 1933 – 20 January 1965) was a Spanish basketball player and coach.

Club career
Hernández played with the Spanish club Espanyol Bàsquet, from 1951 to 1955. After that, he played with Real Madrid. As a member of Real Madrid, he won 2 Spanish League championships, in 1957 and 1958, and also 2 Spanish Kings's Cups, in 1956 and 1957.

National team career
Hernández played internationally with the senior Spanish men's national basketball team, in 41 games. He won the gold medal at the 1955 Mediterranean Games. He also played at the EuroBasket 1959.

Coaching career
After retirement he continued in 1960 in the sport as a basketball coach. He became the head coach of Real Madrid in 1962, and with them he won 2 Spanish League championships, in 1963 and 1964. He also won the premier European-wide competition, the FIBA European Champions Cup (now called EuroLeague) championship, of the 1963–64 season.

Hernández was also the head coach of the senior Spanish national team. He coached Spain at the EuroBasket 1963, and he also led them to the silver medal at the 1963 Mediterranean Games.

Personal life
Hernández died at age 31, in Madrid, Spain, on 20 January 1965, from liver disease.

See also
List of EuroLeague-winning head coaches

References

External links
FIBA Player Profile
Spanish Basketball Federation Player Profile 
JOAQUÍN HERNÁNDEZ 

1933 births
1965 deaths
EuroLeague-winning coaches
Point guards
Real Madrid basketball coaches
Real Madrid Baloncesto players
Spanish basketball coaches
Spanish men's basketball players
Basketball players at the 1955 Mediterranean Games
Mediterranean Games medalists in basketball
Mediterranean Games gold medalists for Spain